The 2009 UCI Juniors Track World Championships were the World Championship for track cycling. They took place in Moscow, Russia from 11 to 15 August 2009. Nineteen events were scheduled.

Medal summary

Medals table

External links
Official event website, UCI

UCI Juniors Track World Championships
Uci Juniors Track World Championships, 2009
Track cycling
International cycle races hosted by Russia